The 2015–16 FC Lokomotiv Moscow season was the club's 24th season in the Russian Premier League, the highest tier of association football in Russia. Lokomotiv Moscow also took part in the Russian Cup and the Europa League.

Personnel

First team squad information

Players and squad numbers last updated on 7 April 2016.Note: Flags indicate national team as has been defined under FIFA eligibility rules. Players may hold more than one non-FIFA nationality.

Transfers

Arrivals

Players in
Note: Flags indicate national team as has been defined under FIFA eligibility rules. Players may hold more than one non-FIFA nationality.

Players in on loan
Note: Flags indicate national team as has been defined under FIFA eligibility rules. Players may hold more than one non-FIFA nationality.

Departures

Players out

Note: Flags indicate national team as has been defined under FIFA eligibility rules. Players may hold more than one non-FIFA nationality.

Players out on loan
Note: Flags indicate national team as has been defined under FIFA eligibility rules. Players may hold more than one non-FIFA nationality.

Friendlies

Pre-season

Mid-season

Competitions

Overview

Russian Super Cup

Russian Premier League

League table

Results by round

Matches

Russian Cup

Europa League

Lokomotiv have qualified directly for the group stage of the 2015-16 UEFA Europa League after winning the 2015 Russian Cup Final.

Group stage

The 48 teams which qualified for the group stage were seeded into four pots based on their 2015 UEFA club coefficients. Lokomotiv fell to be allocated into the third pot. The draw was held on 28 August 2015 in Monaco and Lokomotiv drawn the 2015 Portuguese Cup Winners Sporting CP, Turkish powerhouse Beşiktaş, and the 2015 Albanian league winners Skënderbeu Korçë.

League table

Matches

Knockout phase

The draw for the first stage of the knockout phase, the round of 32, took place on Monday 14 December 2015. Lokomotiv was paired with Turkish side Fenerbahçe.

Round of 32

Squad statistics

After 30 April 2016

Awards

Lokomotiv player of the month award

Awarded monthly to the player that was chosen by fan voting on Lokomotiv's official portal on VK.

Lokomotiv player of the year award

Awarded to the player that was chosen by fan voting on Lokomotiv's official portal on VK as the best player of the season.

References

FC Lokomotiv Moscow seasons
Lokomotiv Moscow
Lokomotiv Moscow